Diplacodes haematodes, the scarlet percher, is a species of dragonfly in the family Libellulidae.
It occurs throughout Australia (except Tasmania), Timor, New Guinea, Vanuatu, and New Caledonia. It is locally common in habitats with hot sunny exposed sites at or near rivers, streams, ponds, and lakes. It often prefers to settle on hot rocks rather than twigs or leaves, and is quite wary. This is a spectacular species of dragonfly, although small in size (wingspan 60mm, length 35mm). The male is brilliant red, the female yellow-ochre. Females have yellow infuscation suffusing the outer wings, while the males have similar colour at the bases of the wings.

Gallery

References

Libellulidae
Odonata of Oceania
Odonata of Australia
Insects of Timor
Taxa named by Hermann Burmeister
Insects described in 1839